Thomas Falvey (April 21, 1828January 16, 1875) was an Irish American businessman and Democratic politician.  He was the 16th mayor of Racine, Wisconsin, and represented Racine in the Wisconsin State Assembly in 1855 and 1856.

Biography

Born in Clare, County Clare, Ireland, Falvey emigrated to the United States with his mother in 1833 and settled in Little Falls, New York where he worked as a moulder. Falvey then moved to Fulton New York. In 1851, Falvey moved to Racine, Wisconsin and was in the farm implement business. In 1855 and 1856, Falvey served in the Wisconsin State Assembly and was a Democrat. Later, Falvey served as mayor of Racine, Wisconsin. Falvey died suddenly of a heart attack in Racine, Wisconsin shortly after returning from a business trip to Kansas City.

Notes

1828 births
1875 deaths
19th-century Irish people
Irish emigrants to the United States (before 1923)
People from County Clare
People from Little Falls, New York
Businesspeople from Wisconsin
Mayors of Racine, Wisconsin
19th-century American politicians
19th-century American businesspeople
Democratic Party members of the Wisconsin State Assembly